KCGI may refer to:

 The Kyoto College of Graduate Studies for Informatics
 KCGI-CA, a defunct television station (channel 45) formerly licensed to Cape Girardeau, Missouri, United States
 the ICAO code for Cape Girardeau Regional Airport